Microsoft Inspire (formerly the Microsoft Worldwide Partner Conference, and previously abbreviated WPC) is a conference held annually by Microsoft Corporation for its partner community. At Inspire, partners are taught about Microsoft's roadmap for the upcoming year, network and build connections, share best practices, experience the latest product innovations, and learn new skills and techniques. There are also keynote addresses from Microsoft executives, featured speakers, business-track specific offerings, and hundreds of sessions.

In its current form, it has been held since 2003.  
Before 2003, it was two different events, Microsoft Fusion and the Microsoft Business Solutions Stampede. In recent years, not including the Virtual Online events, it has been co-located with the Microsoft internal Microsoft Ready conference.

References

External links

Microsoft conferences